The Call of the East is a 1922 British silent adventure film directed by Bert Wynne and starring Warwick Ward, Doris Eaton and Walter Tennyson. It is also known by the alternative title of His Supreme Sacrifice.

Cast
 Warwick Ward as Arthur Burleigh  
 Doris Eaton as Mrs. Burleigh  
 Walter Tennyson as Jack Verity  
 Dorinea Shirley
 Francis Innys

References

Bibliography
 Low, Rachel. The History of British Film: Volume IV, 1918–1929. Routledge, 1997.

External links

1922 films
British adventure films
British silent feature films
1922 adventure films
1920s English-language films
Films directed by Bert Wynne
Films set in Egypt
British black-and-white films
Silent adventure films
1920s British films